The Iraqi Popular Army also known as the People's Army or People's Militia  (Arabic: الجيش الشعبي Al Jaysh ash Shaabi) was a paramilitary organization composed of civilian volunteers to protect the Ba'ath regime against internal opposition and serve as a counterbalance against any coup attempt by the regular Iraqi Army.

In 1987, the People's Army, standing at an estimated 650,000, approached the regular armed forces' manpower strength.

History
Officially, it was the Iraqi Baath Party Militia and included a special youth section. Formed in 1970, the People's Army grew rapidly, and by 1977 it was estimated to have 50,000 active members. Subsequently, a phenomenal growth, giving the militia extensive internal security functions, occurred. Whereas its original purpose was to give the Baath Party an active role in every town and village, the People's Army in 1981 began its most ambitious task to date, the support of the regular armed forces.

The official functions of the People's Army were to act as backup to the regular armed forces in times of war and to safeguard revolutionary achievements, to promote mass consciousness, to consolidate national unity, and to bolster the relationship between the people and the army in times of peace. The People's Army dispatched units to Iraqi Kurdistan before 1980 and to Lebanon to fight with Palestinian guerrillas during the 1975–76 Civil War. Foreign observers concluded, however, that the primary function of the People's Army was political in nature; first, to enlist popular support for the Baath Party, and second, to act as a counterweight against any coup attempts by the regular armed forces.

Beginning in 1974, Taha Yassin Ramadan, a close associate of President Saddam Hussein, commanded the People's Army, which was responsible for internal security. The command of such a large military establishment gave Ramadan so much power, however, that some foreign observers speculated that the primary function of his second in command was to keep him from using the People's Army as a personal power base.

People's Army members were recruited from among both women and men (who had completed their regular army service) eighteen years of age and older. It was unclear whether or not Baath Party membership was a prerequisite—especially after 1981 when the numerical strength of the People's Army ballooned—but, clearly, party indoctrination was at least as important as military training. Members usually underwent a two-month annual training period, and they were paid from party funds. Although the extent of their training was unknown in early 1988, all recruits were instructed in the use of a rifle. Graduates were responsible for guarding government buildings and installations, and they were concentrated around sensitive centers in major towns. Militia members possessed some sophisticated arms, and it was possible that disgruntled officers contemplating a challenge to Saddam Hussein could rally the support of a force of such militiamen.

The People's Army was sent into Iraqi Kurdistan before 1980 and even out of the country to such hot spots as Lebanon to fight with Palestinian guerrillas during the 1975–76 Civil War.

It was only dissolved when Taha Yassin Ramadan became Vice President of Iraq in 1991.

Action seen

Al-Faw

The First Battle of Al-Faw, fought on February 11, 1986, was a battle of the Iran–Iraq War. The Iranians launched a surprise attack against the Iraqi troops defending the al-Faw Peninsula. The Iraqi units in charge of the defenses were mostly made up of poorly trained Iraqi Popular Army conscripts that collapsed when they were suddenly attacked by the Iranian Pasdaran (Revolutionary Guard) forces.

See also
 Iraqi Army
 Fedayeen Saddam
 National Defense Battalions

References

1970 establishments in Iraq
Ba'athist organizations
History of the Ba'ath Party
Military units and formations disestablished in 1991
Military units and formations established in 1970
Military wings of socialist parties
Organizations associated with the Ba'ath Party
Organizations of the 1991 uprisings in Iraq
Paramilitary forces of Iraq
Saddam Hussein